Georgia's 15th Senate District elects one member of the Georgia Senate. Its current representative is Democrat Ed Harbison.

References

Georgia Senate districts